Richard Turner is a radio producer for the BBC. He is one of the co-creators of the BBC Radio 4 panel show The Museum of Curiosity, along with John Lloyd, who also presents the series, and Dan Schreiber, who co-produces the series with Turner. He also worked as script editor for the BBC Radio 7 series The Penny Dreadfuls Present....

References

External links
Richard Turner's Twitter page.

Living people
BBC people
British radio producers
Year of birth missing (living people)